Alessandro Di Martile (born 2 May 1979) is an Italian former football manager and player.

Career
Di Martile played youth football for TV Unterboihingen and FV 09 Nürtingen before joining the academy of Stuttgarter Kickers. He would go on to make more than 100 appearances for the reserve team, Stuttgarter Kickers II. He made his professional debut for the first team on 14 May 1999, coming on as a substitute in the 65th minute of a 2–0 loss in the 2. Bundesliga to SpVgg Unterhaching. He could not establish himself in the team, however, and moved to Swiss club FC Schaffhausen in 2001. The following years, Di Martile played in the lower tiers of German football for clubs such as FC 08 Villingen and SGV Freiberg. He retired from football as a player-coach in the Kreisliga for TSuGV Großbettlingen.

References

External links

Profile at kickersarchiv.de

1979 births
Living people
Italian footballers
Stuttgarter Kickers players
Stuttgarter Kickers II players
FC Schaffhausen players
FC 08 Villingen players
SGV Freiberg players
2. Bundesliga players
Oberliga (football) players
People from Nürtingen
Sportspeople from Stuttgart (region)
Association football midfielders
Footballers from Baden-Württemberg
Association football coaches
Italian football managers